628 Christine is a minor planet orbiting the Sun.

References

External links
 
 

000628
Discoveries by August Kopff
Named minor planets
000628
19070307